Thomas Brown Holmes Stenhouse (21 February 1825 – 7 March 1882) was an early Mormon pioneer and missionary who later became a Godbeite and with his wife, Fanny Stenhouse, became a vocal opponent of the Church of Jesus Christ of Latter-day Saints (LDS Church).

Stenhouse was born in Dalkeith, Scotland. He joined the LDS Church in England in 1845. In 1850, Stenhouse married Fanny Warn and shortly thereafter joined Lorenzo Snow and Joseph Toronto on a mission to Italy; they became the first LDS Church missionaries to preach in that country. Later in the same year, Stenhouse was sent to Switzerland and became the first Mormon missionary to preach there.

In 1855, Stenhouse and his wife emigrated to Utah Territory. They settled in Salt Lake City; Stenhouse the editor of the Salt Lake Telegraph, a newspaper that was consistently pro-Mormon. Their daughter, Clara Federata Stenhouse, married Joseph Angell Young.  In 1870, Stenhouse was convinced by the writings of William S. Godbe, who criticised LDS Church President Brigham Young on political and religious grounds. The Stenhouses were particularly opposed to the LDS Church's practice of plural marriage. Stenhouse and his wife became part of the "Godbeites" and were excommunicated from the LDS Church.

As Godbeites, Stenhouse and his wife published several exposés of Mormonism. Stenhouse's most famous work is his 1873 The Rocky Mountain Saints: A Full and Complete History of the Mormons. In 1872, Fanny Stenhouse published "Tell it All": The Story of a Life Experience in Mormonism.
Stenhouse died in San Francisco, California.

References

1825 births
1882 deaths
19th-century Mormon missionaries
Converts to Mormonism
Critics of Mormonism
Scottish emigrants to the United States
Scottish Latter Day Saints
Scottish Mormon missionaries
Scottish newspaper editors
19th-century Scottish writers
Religious leaders from Utah
Godbeites
Historians of the Latter Day Saint movement
Scottish Latter Day Saint writers
Mormon missionaries in Italy
Mormon missionaries in Switzerland
People excommunicated by the Church of Jesus Christ of Latter-day Saints
People from Dalkeith
Mormon pioneers
19th-century American journalists
American male journalists